The Punisher: Dirty Laundry, also known simply as Dirty Laundry (stylized as #DIRTYLAUNDRY), is a 2012 American short film based on the Marvel Comics anti-hero the Punisher, starring Thomas Jane (reprising the title role from the 2004 film The Punisher) and Ron Perlman, produced by Adi Shankar and directed by Phil Joanou. The film was first screened at the 2012 San Diego Comic-Con International.

Plot
In a run-down neighborhood, Frank Castle wakes up and exits his van to get his laundry done. On his way to the coin-op laundromat, he witnesses a street gang stop and confront three prostitutes before Goldtooth, the gang leader, takes one of them to a back alley where he beats and rapes her. Despite hearing her screams from a distance, Frank minds his business and places his laundry in a washing machine.

Minutes later, a boy named DeShawn crosses through the neighborhood and is harassed by the gang while Goldtooth offers him an opportunity to sell drugs for them. When DeShawn refuses, the gang members begin to mug him. After a brief verbal confrontation with Goldtooth, Frank walks to a liquor store across the street to get a bottle of Yoo-hoo. There, a handicapped store clerk named Big Mike tells him that two years ago, he witnessed a similar situation and insinuates that he wound up crippled for confronting the criminals.

Frank pays for the Yoo-hoo and also buys a bottle of Jack Daniel's, which he uses to club some of the gang members to death, while killing others with their own guns and knives. He then breaks Goldtooth's right arm and both legs before asking him if he knows what the difference between justice and punishment is, while pouring the whiskey on him. Frank pulls out a lighter, and places it on the ground before returning to the laundromat.

The battered prostitute returns to the scene to pick up the lighter and sets the gang leader on fire as Frank walks back to his van with his laundry. DeShawn approaches him to return a T-shirt he dropped, but Frank tells him to keep it. As Frank drives off, the boy unfolds the shirt to reveal the Punisher symbol.

Cast
 Thomas Jane as Frank Castle / The Punisher
 Ron Perlman as Big Mike
 Shannon Collis as Hooker #1
 Jack Goldenberg as The Doorman
 Sammi Rotibi as Goldtooth
 Brandee Tucker as The Girl
 Karlin Walker as DeShawn

Production

The film is the first medium to reveal a new Punisher logo designed by Tim Bradstreet. Thomas Jane screened the film at the RAW Studios panel at the 2012 San Diego Comic-Con International. In explaining the reason for this project, he posted this quote on YouTube:

Reception
Ivan Kander of Shortoftheweek.com called the film a "love letter" to the Punisher character and a success. He also stated that the film "proves that fan films aren't just for crazed geeks running around with their home video cameras anymore". He did criticise the films for having a rather thin plot and predictable outcome for the villain but praised the production value.

Kyle Anderson of The Nerdist stated that the film was worth watching and stated that Jane should reprise the role of the Punisher again if another theatrical film was to be made.

Chris Sims of ComicsAlliance expressed that the film was interesting in that it showed the main character in a transitioning period between that of the 2004 Punisher film and how the character is portrayed in the comic books as the Punisher in the 2004 film was more concerned with getting revenge as opposed to waging a war on crime.

Brad Brevet of Comingsoon.net criticized the use of Hans Zimmer's and James Newton Howard's The Dark Knight score, especially in the opening moments when the film's antagonist appears with music playing from his car stereo, but stated that the short was otherwise solid.

At the time of its release Followingthenerd.com described the film as "arguably the best 10 minutes of screen time The Punisher has ever had".

Jon Bernthal, who portrays Frank Castle / The Punisher in the Marvel Cinematic Universe, has stated that he took Jane's performance in the short as inspiration.

Sequel
In an interview with Inverse Adi Shankar revealed that he was previously in pre-production on a sequel to Dirty Laundry, stating that the film was "going to be a two-hander that introduced the 'Lady Punisher', who was going to be played by MMA fighter and Deadpool actress Gina Carano. Thomas Jane was due to reprise his role in the sequel, and the script was written by Wayne Kramer. Shankar stated in the interview (regarding the film) that: "it may still be revisited and revived at some point down the road, and that it shouldn't be ruled out just yet."

Accolades
The film was nominated for a Webby Award for the category Online Film & Video, Drama: Long Form or Series and was listed on Collider's Top 5 Surprises of 2012.

In 2016 ScreenGeek.net named the film the number one fan film based on comics and stated that the film revolutionized the world of the fan film community.

See also
 Punisher in film
 Punisher in television
 Do Not Fall in New York City, another Punisher fan film

References

External links
 
 

2012 films
2012 short films
2010s American films
2010s English-language films
American action drama films
American crime action films
American crime drama films
American drama short films
American rape and revenge films
Films directed by Phil Joanou
Films released on YouTube
Films shot in Los Angeles
Punisher fan films
Short films based on Marvel Comics
Unofficial sequel films